Rattikan Thongsombut ( born 7 July 1991) is a Thai international footballer who plays as a midfielder for the Thailand women's national football team.

International goals

References

External links 
 
 

1991 births
Living people
Women's association football midfielders
Rattikan Thongsombut
2015 FIFA Women's World Cup players
Footballers at the 2014 Asian Games
Rattikan Thongsombut
Rattikan Thongsombut
Rattikan Thongsombut
Southeast Asian Games medalists in football
Footballers at the 2018 Asian Games
Competitors at the 2017 Southeast Asian Games
2019 FIFA Women's World Cup players
Rattikan Thongsombut
Competitors at the 2019 Southeast Asian Games